Henry Charles Howard (17 September 1850 – 4 August 1914) was a British politician.

A member of the influential Howard family headed by the Duke of Norfolk, he was the eldest son of Henry Howard, son of Lord Henry Howard-Molyneux-Howard, younger brother of Bernard Howard, 12th Duke of Norfolk. His mother was Charlotte Caroline Georgina, daughter of Henry Lawes Long and Catharine Long, while Sir Stafford Howard and Esme Howard, 1st Baron Howard of Penrith, were his younger brothers. He entered Parliament for Penrith in December 1885, but only held the seat until July the following year. Initially a Liberal, he disagreed with William Ewart Gladstone's Irish policy and joined the Liberal Unionists. He resided at Greystoke Castle in Cumberland.

Howard married Lady Mabel Harriet, daughter of Mark McDonnell, 5th Earl of Antrim, in 1878. He died in August 1914, aged 63. Lady Mabel, who was appointed a CBE in 1920, died in December 1942.

References

 
 www.thepeerage.com

External links 
 

1850 births
1914 deaths
Henry Howard
Liberal Party (UK) MPs for English constituencies
UK MPs 1885–1886
Liberal Unionist Party MPs for English constituencies